Sir Clifford Darling  (6 February 1923 – 27 December 2011) was the fifth governor-general of the Bahamas from 2 January 1992 until his retirement on 2 January 1995, where he was succeeded by Sir Orville Turnquest.

Life
Darling, who was born in Acklins, originally worked as a taxi cab driver, and served as both the general secretary and president of the Bahamas Taxi Cab Union.

In 1958, he helped make a settlement of a general strike.

He served as a Senator from 1964 to 1967, Deputy Speaker of the House of Assembly from 1967 to 1969, Minister of State in 1969, Minister of Labour and Welfare in 1971 and Minister of Labour and National Insurance from 1974 to 1977. He was Speaker of the House of Assembly from 1977 until becoming Governor-General in 1992, retiring in 1995.

In 1977, he was knighted. He was a member of the Progressive Liberal Party.

He died on 27 December 2011 in Princess Margaret Hospital after a long illness.

References

External links

1923 births
2011 deaths
Knights Bachelor
Knights Grand Cross of the Royal Victorian Order
Politicians awarded knighthoods
Governors-General of the Bahamas
Speakers of the House of Assembly of the Bahamas
Members of the House of Assembly of the Bahamas
Members of the Senate of the Bahamas
Taxi drivers
People from Acklins
Labor ministers of the Bahamas